Goldy may refer to:

People

Given name
 Goldy (rapper) (born 1969), American rapper
 Goldy Goldstein (1904–1948), American football player
 Goldy Locks (born 1979), American musician
 Goldy McJohn (1945–2017), Canadian keyboard player
 Goldy Notay, British-Canadian film actress
 nickname of Paul Goldschmidt (born 1987), American baseball first baseman

Surname
 Craig Goldy (born 1961), American musician
 Faith Goldy (born 1989), Canadian commentator
 Luv Kumar Goldy, Indian legislator
 Purnal Goldy (1937-2009), American professional baseball player

Other uses
 Goldy Gopher, University of Minnesota mascot 
 Goldy, a character in the film A Rage in Harlem

See also
 Golda (disambiguation)
 Goldie (disambiguation)